Raúl Vicente Amarilla (born 19 July 1960, in Luque) is a Paraguayan retired footballer who played as a striker. Born in Paraguay, he represented Spain internationally with the under-21 team.

Playing career
Amarilla made his debut in his hometown team, Sportivo Luqueño at the age of 17. Because of his scoring ability and great heading skills (he was fairly tall, 6 feet 3 inches) he soon moved to Spain and signed for Real Zaragoza. Before making his debut with Real Zaragoza, he was loaned to Racing de Santander for the 1980/81 season. Amarilla returned to Real Zaragoza where he gained success by leading the team in scoring in the 1982–83 season, finishing as the second best scorer in La Liga. Because of his success in the Spanish League, Amarilla was asked to play for the Spain national under-21 football team. He accepted the offer and this is why later in his career he was not able to play for the Paraguay national team. After several seasons with Real Zaragoza, Amarilla joined FC Barcelona between 1985 and 1988.

Amarilla returned to Paraguay in 1988 to play for Club Olimpia de Asunción. In 1989, while playing for Olimpia he was the top scorer in the Copa Libertadores of the same year with 10 goals. For the second half of 1989 he went on loan to the América de Mexico football team. Despite playing for a brief period, he established himself as a fan favorite by scoring 21 goals and eventually was chosen as one of the top 100 players in Club America's history.

He returned in 1990 to Paraguay to play again for Olimpia. In that year, he helped the team win the Copa Libertadores, the Supercopa and Recopa Sudamericana by forming the unforgettable feared attacking Olimpia trio along with Gabriel González and Adriano Samaniego. To top his great performance in the year 1990, he was voted South American Footballer of the Year.

In 1993, he migrated to Japan and the next year, at the age of 34, he returned to Paraguay and retired from professional football by playing again in Olimpia, where he is one of the most loved former players by the fans.

Coaching career
A few years after retiring from professional football, Amarilla began coaching small teams in the Paraguayan league such as Club Sportivo San Lorenzo and Sportivo Luqueño where he achieved minor success. Afterwards, Amarilla was named the assistant coach of Anibal Ruiz for the Paraguay national team during the 2006 FIFA World Cup qualification and the 2006 World Cup. After Ruiz resigned from the Paraguay national team, Amarilla was named as the interim head coach by the Paraguayan Football Association until the start of 2007, where Gerardo Martino was appointed as the new manager. Amarilla currently works as the director of the youth divisions of Olimpia.

Career statistics

Club

Honours

Club

Individual
Paraguayan 1st Division top scorer in 1988
Copa Libertadores top scorer in 1989
South American Footballer of the Year in 1990

References

External links
Amarilla article on Club Olimpia website 
Sport.es Amarilla article

1960 births
Living people
Sportspeople from Luque
Spanish footballers
Spanish football managers
Spain under-21 international footballers
Paraguayan footballers
Paraguayan football managers
Paraguayan people of Spanish descent
Paraguayan emigrants to Spain
Paraguayan Primera División players
La Liga players
Liga MX players
Sportivo Luqueño players
FC Barcelona players
Real Zaragoza players
Racing de Santander players
Club América footballers
Club Olimpia footballers
Spanish expatriate footballers
Paraguayan expatriate footballers
Expatriate footballers in Japan
Expatriate footballers in Mexico
J1 League players
Yokohama Flügels players
Association football forwards
Copa Libertadores-winning players
South American Footballer of the Year winners
Club Tacuary managers
Sportivo Luqueño managers